Kellie-Ann Leyland (born 5 November 1986 in St Helens, Merseyside) is an English-born Northern Irish former footballer. She played for Curzon Ashton Ladies and Northern Ireland as a central defender.

Club career

Early career
Leyland represented Newton-le-Willows High School and Merseyside Girls U16s. She played for Huyton, Sefton and Garswood Saints at club level and also attended the Centres of Excellence at Liverpool, Burnley, Everton and Tranmere Rovers.

She took A-Levels at the national women's football academy in Durham from 2003–2005, then departed to America on a scholarship.

Senior career
Leyland played for the Hartford Hawks for four seasons while attending the University of Hartford. She played for Northern Irish club Northland Raiders to maintain fitness during the winter.

Leyland signed for W-League club Ottawa Fury Women in 2009.

For 2009–10, Leyland joined Curzon Ashton Ladies in the FA Women's Premier League Northern Division. Her appearances were curtailed by a serious knee injury.

International career
Leyland played for England U-17s as a 15-year-old. But in 2003 she switched allegiance to Northern Ireland and captained their U-19s.

She went on to be a full Northern Ireland international, making her debut in a 3–1 defeat to Sweden on 5 March 2005.

Personal life
Leyland's mother, Jenny Leyland, was awarded an MBE for services to grassroots football in January 2011. Leyland senior is a youth football coach in Cheshire and also Runcorn Linnets' physiotherapist.

References

External links
IFA bio of Kellie-Ann Leyland
Hartford bio of Kellie-Ann Leyland
Ottawa Fury bio of Kellie-Ann Leyland
Curzon Ashton bio of Kellie-Ann Leyland

1986 births
Living people
English women's footballers
Expatriate women's soccer players in Canada
Footballers from St Helens, Merseyside
Hartford Hawks women's soccer players
Northern Ireland women's international footballers
Women's association football central defenders
Women's association footballers from Northern Ireland
FA Women's National League players
USL W-League (1995–2015) players
Expatriate sportspeople from Northern Ireland in Canada
Ottawa Fury (women) players